Vidyadhar Patil (born 5 September 2000) is an Indian cricketer. He made his Twenty20 debut on 4 November 2021, for Karnataka in the 2021–22 Syed Mushtaq Ali Trophy. Prior to his Twenty20 debut, he was named in India's squad for the 2020 Under-19 Cricket World Cup. He made his List A debut on 8 December 2021, for Karnataka in the 2021–22 Vijay Hazare Trophy. He made his first-class debut on 17 February 2022, for Karnataka in the 2021–22 Ranji Trophy.

References

External links
 

2000 births
Living people
Indian cricketers
Karnataka cricketers